
The Arabic–English Lexicon is an Arabic–English dictionary compiled by Edward William Lane (died 1876). It was published in eight volumes during the second half of the 19th century. It consists of Arabic words defined and explained in the English language. But Lane does not use his own knowledge of Arabic to give definitions to the words. Instead, the definitions are taken from older Arabic dictionaries, primarily medieval Arabic dictionaries. Lane translates these definitions into English, and he carefully notes which dictionaries are giving which definitions.

History

In 1842, Lane, who had already won fame as an Arabist for his Manners and Customs of the Modern Egyptians and his version of the One Thousand and One Nights, received a sponsorship from Lord Prudhoe, later Duke of Northumberland, to compile an Arabic–English dictionary.

Lane set to work at once, making his third voyage to Cairo to collect materials in the same year. Since the Muslim scholars there were reluctant to lend manuscripts to Lane, the acquisition of materials was commissioned to Ibrahim Al-Dasuqi (1811–1883), a graduate of Azhar and a teacher in Boulaq. In order to collect and collate the materials, Lane stayed in Cairo for seven years, working arduously with little rest and recreation. The acquisition of materials, which took 13 years, was left in the hands of Al-Dasuqi when Lane returned to England in 1849.

Back to England, Lane continued to work on the dictionary with zeal, complaining that he was so used to the cursive calligraphy of his Arabic manuscripts that the Western print strained his eyes. He had arrived at the letter Qāf, the 21st letter of the Arabic alphabet, when he died in 1876.

Lane's lexicon is based on medieval Arabic dictionaries plus the dictionary Taj al-ʿArus ("Crown of the Bride") by al-Zabidi which was completed in the early 19th century. In total, 112 lexicographic sources are cited in the work. Lane also read widely in order to provide examples for the entries.

The lexicon was designed to consist of two "Books" or Divisions: one for the common, classical words, another for the rare ones. Volume I of the First Division was published in 1863; Volume II in 1865; Volume III in 1867; Volumes IV and V in 1872. A total of 2,219 pages were proofread by Lane himself. Lane's great-nephew Stanley Lane-Poole published Volumes VI, VII and VIII from 1877 to 1893 using Lane's incomplete notes left behind him. Those later volumes are sketchy and full of gaps. In total, the First Division comprises 3,064 pages. Nothing has come out of the planned Second Division. Thus the work has never been completed.

Lane's work focuses on classical vocabulary, thus later scholars found it necessary to compile supplements to the work for post-classical usage, such as the Supplément aux dictionnaires arabes (1881; 2nd ed., 1927) by the Dutch Arabist Reinhart Dozy; also, the Wörterbuch der klassischen arabischen Sprache, being published from 1970 onwards by the Deutsche Morgenländische Gesellschaft, starts from Kāf, thus supplementing Lane's work in effect.

The first draft of the lexicon, as well as the whole Taj al-ʿArus copied by Al-Dasuqi for Lane in 24 volumes, are now preserved in the British Library.

Bibliographic details
 Edward William Lane, An Arabic–English Lexicon, vols 6–8 ed. by Stanley Lane-Poole, 8 vols (London: Williams and Norgate, 1863–93).

Editions
Digitisation at quranic-research.net
Arabic–English Lexicon: Downloadable in eight volumes – when downloaded in the DjVu fileformat, the English text is searchable, the Arabic text is not searchable.
Arabic–English Lexicon: Online searchable by the Arabic rootword
Arabic–English Lexicon: Rootwords accessible online through a clickable list
1992. Cambridge, UK: Islamic Texts Society. 2 volumes. .
1980/1997. Beirut, Lebanon: Librairie du Liban. 8 volumes.
2003. New Delhi, India: Asian Educational Services. 8 volumes. .
2004. AramediA. CD-ROM. ASIN 3908153557.
Year unknown. Lahore, Pakistan: Suhail Academy. 2 volumes (reprint of ITS ed.). .
2015. Qum, Iran: Entekhab, 1436 AH/ 1394 Sh/ 2015. 4 volumes. (With two prefaces in English and Persian by the contemporary Iranian academic, scholar, and translator, Dr. Muhammad-Reza Fakhr-Rohani).

See also
 List of most expensive books and manuscripts

Notes and references

Arberry, A.J. (1960). Oriental Essays. London: George Allen & Unwin.
Irwin, Robert (2006). For Lust of Knowing. London: Allen Lane.
Roper, Geoffrey (1998). "Texts from Nineteenth-Century Egypt: The Role of E. W. Lane", in Paul and Janet Starky (eds) Travellers in Egypt, London; New York: I.B. Tauris, pp. 244–254.

External links
 Lane's Arabic–English Lexicon: Downloadable in eight volumes (download it in the DjVu format, not the PDF format because the PDF format in this case only has the raw page photographs).
 Online edition linked by Arabic root to specific pages
Online edition in Perseus Digital Library Project
Online edition at Quranic-Research (optimized Perseus text)
 Online edition searchable by Arabic roots (provides column view for smaller screens)

Arabic dictionaries